Below is the list of populated places in Sakarya Province of Turkey by ilçes (districts) In the following lists first place in each list is the administrative center of the district.

Adapazarı
Adapazarı
Abalı, Adapazarı
Aşırlar, Adapazarı
Bileciler, Adapazarı
Budaklar, Adapazarı
Büyükhataplı, Adapazarı
Çağlayan , Adapazarı
Demirbey, Adapazarı
Elmalı , Adapazarı
Hacılar , Adapazarı
İlyaslar , Adapazarı
Işıklar, Adapazarı
Karadavutlu , Adapazarı
Karadere , Adapazarı
Kavaklıorman , Adapazarı
Kayrancık, Adapazarı
Kışla, Adapazarı
Kömürlük , Adapazarı
Köprübaşı , Adapazarı
Poyrazlar , Adapazarı
Küçükhataplı, Adapazarı
Nasuhlar , Adapazarı
Örentepe , Adapazarı
Poyrazlar , Adapazarı
Salmanlı , Adapazarı
Solaklar , Adapazarı
Turnadere, Adapazarı
Yeşilyurt , Adapazarı

Akyazı
Akyazı
Alaağaç , Akyazı
Altındere, Akyazı
Ballıkaya , Akyazı
Bediltahirbey , Akyazı
Beldibi , Akyazı
Bıçkıdere, Akyazı
Boztepe, Akyazı
Buğdaylı , Akyazı
Çakıroğlu, Akyazı
Çatalköprü, Akyazı
Dedeler , Akyazı
Dokurcun , Akyazı
Durmuşlar, Akyazı
Düzyazı , Akyazı
Gökçeler, Akyazı
Güvençler, Akyazı
Güzlek , Akyazı
Hanyatak , Akyazı
Harunusta , Akyazı
Hasanbey, Akyazı
Haydarlar , Akyazı
Karaçalılık , Akyazı
Kepekli , Akyazı
Kızılcıkorman, Akyazı
Kumköprü , Akyazı
Kuzuluk , Akyazı
Madenler, Akyazı
Mansurlar , Akyazı
Merkezyeniköy , Akyazı
Osmanbey, Akyazı
Pazarköy , Akyazı
Reşadiye, Akyazı
Salihiye , Akyazı
Şerefiye, Akyazı
Sukenarı, Akyazı
Taşağıl , Akyazı
Taşburun, Akyazı
Taşyatak , Akyazı
Topağaç, Akyazı
Türkormanköy, Akyazı
Yağcılar, Akyazı
Yenidoğan , Akyazı
Yongalık , Akyazı
Yörükyeri , Akyazı
Yuvalak , Akyazı

Arifiye
Arifiye
Adliye, Arifiye
Ahmediye, Arifiye
Çınardibi, Arifiye
Kemaliye, Arifiye
Kışlaçay, Arifiye
Yukarıkirazca, Arifiye

Erenler
Erenler
Değirmendere, Erenler
Ekili, Erenler
Kayalarmemduhiye, Erenler
Küçükesence, Erenler
Yazılı, Eerenler

Ferizli
Ferizli
Ağacık, Ferizli
Akçukur, Ferizli
Bakırlı, Ferizli
Ceylandere, Ferizli
Çiftlik , Ferizli
Doğancı , Ferizli
Gölkent, Ferizli
Hocaoğlu, Ferizli
Karadiken, Ferizli
Konuklu , Ferizli
Kusca, Ferizli
Nalköy, Ferizli
Sarıahmetler, Ferizli
Seyifler , Ferizli
Sinanoğlu, Ferizli
Teberik, Ferizli
Tokat , Ferizli

Geyve
Geyve
Ahibaba , Geyve
Akdoğan , Geyve
Akıncı, Geyve
Akkaya, Geyve
Alifuatpaşa , Geyve
Alıplar, Geyve
Aydınlar , Geyve
Bağcaz, Geyve
Bağlarbaşı , Geyve
Bayat , Geyve
Belpınar , Geyve
Boğazköy, Geyve
Bozören, Geyve
Burhaniye, Geyve
Çamlık , Geyve
Çayköy , Geyve
Ceceler , Geyve
Çengel , Geyve
Çine , Geyve
Çukurköy, Geyve
Demirler , Geyve
Dereköy, Geyve
Doğançay , Geyve
Doğancıl, Geyve
Doğantepe , Geyve
Düzakçaşehir , Geyve
Epçeler , Geyve
Esenköy , Geyve
Eşme, Geyve
Fındıksuyu , Geyve
Güney, Geyve
Günhoşlar, Geyve
Hacılar, Geyve
Hacıosmanlar , Geyve
Halidiye, Geyve
Hırka, Geyve
Hisarlık, Geyve
İhsaniye, Geyve
Ilıca, Geyve
İlimbey, Geyve
Kamışlı, Geyve
Karaçam , Geyve
Karacaören , Geyve
Kızılkaya, Geyve
Köprübaşı, Geyve
Koru , Geyve
Kozan, Geyve
Kulfallar, Geyve
Maksudiye , Geyve
Melekşeoruç , Geyve
Melekşesolak, Geyve
Nuruosmaniye, Geyve
Örencik , Geyve
Poydular , Geyve
Sabırlar , Geyve
Safibey , Geyve
Saraçlı , Geyve
Sarıgazi , Geyve
Şehren, Geyve
Sekiharman, Geyve
Şerefiye , Geyve
Setçe , Geyve
Suçatı , Geyve
Sütalan , Geyve
Taşoluk , Geyve
Umurbey , Geyve
Yaylak , Geyve

Hendek
 Hendek
Akarca, Hendek
Akçayır , Hendek
Aksu, Hendek
Aktefek , Hendek
Aşağıçalıca , Hendek
Bakacak, Hendek
Balıklıihsaniye , Hendek
Beyköy , Hendek
Beylice , Hendek
Bıçkıatik , Hendek
Çakallık, Hendek
Çamlıca, Hendek
Çayırbaşı , Hendek
Çobanyatak , Hendek
Çukurhan , Hendek
Dereköy , Hendek
Dikmen, Hendek
Esentepe , Hendek
Eskibıçkı, Hendek
Göksu , Hendek
Güldibi , Hendek
Gündoğan , Hendek
Güney , Hendek
Hacıkışla , Hendek
Hacimbey , Hendek
Halaç, Hendek
Hamitli , Hendek
Harmantepe, Hendek
Hicriye , Hendek
Hüseyinşeyh, Hendek
İkbaliye , Hendek
İkramiye , Hendek
Kadifekale, Hendek
Kahraman , Hendek
Kalayık, Hendek
Karadere , Hendek
Karatoprak, Hendek
Kargalıyeniköy , Hendek
Kazımiye , Hendek
Kırktepe , Hendek
Kızanlık, Hendek
Kocatönge, Hendek
Kurtuluş , Hendek
Lütfiyeköşk, Hendek
Martinler , Hendek
Muradiye , Hendek
Nuriye , Hendek
Ortaköy , Hendek
Paşaköy , Hendek
Pınarlı , Hendek
Sarıyer, Hendek
Servetiye , Hendek
Şeyhler , Hendek
Sivritepe, Hendek
Sofular , Hendek
Soğuksu , Hendek
Sukenarı , Hendek
Süleymaniye, Hendek
Sümbüllü, Hendek
Türbe , Hendek
Tuzak , Hendek
Uzuncaorman, Hendek
Yağbasan, Hendek
Yarıca , Hendek
Yayalar , Hendek
Yeniköy , Hendek
Yeniyayla , Hendek
Yeşilköy, Hendek
Yeşilvadi , Hendek
Yukarıçalıca , Hendek
Yukarıhüseyinşeyh, Hendek

Karapürçek
Karapürçek
Ahmediye, Karpürçek
Harmanlı , Karpürçek
Kanlıçay , Karpürçek
Küçükkarapürçek , Karpürçek
Mecidiye, Karpürçek
Meşepınarı , Karpürçek
Mesudiye, Karpürçek
Teketaban, Karpürçek

Karasu
Karasu
Adatepe , Karasul
Akkum, Karasul
Ardıçbeli, Karasul
Camitepe, Karasul
Çatalüvez , Karasul
Darıçayırı , Karasul
Denizköy , Karasul
Gölköprü , Karasul
Hürriyet , Karasul
İhsaniye, Karasul
Kancalar , Karasul
Karamüezzinler , Karasul
Karanlıkdere, Karasul
Karapınar , Karasul
Karasu , Karasul
Kızılcık , Karasul
Konacık , Karasul
Kurudere , Karasul
Kurumeşe , Karasul
Kuyumculu , Karasul
Limandere , Karasul
Manavpınarı , Karasul
Ortaköy, Karasul
Paralı , Karasul
Resuller , Karasul
Subatağı, Karasul
Taşlıgeçit, Karasul
Tepetarla, Karasul
Tuzla , Karasul
Üçoluk , Karasul
Yassıgeçit, Karasul
Yenidoğan , Karasul
Yeşilköy, Karasul
Yuvalıdere , Karasul

Kaynarca
Kaynarca
Akbaşlı , Kaynarca
Arifağa , Kaynarca
Başoğlu, Kaynarca
Birlik, Kaynarca
Büyükyanık, Kaynarca
Cebek, Kaynarca
Duduköy , Kaynarca
Eğrioğlu , Kaynarca
Gaziler, Kaynarca
Gölce , Kaynarca
Gürpınar , Kaynarca
Güven , Kaynarca
İmamlar, Kaynarca
İşaret , Kaynarca
Kalburcu, Kaynarca
Karaçalı, Kaynarca
Karamanlar , Kaynarca
Kayacık, Kaynarca
Kertil, Kaynarca
Kırktepe, Kaynarca
Kızılcaali, Kaynarca
Küçükkaynarca, Kaynarca
Küçükkışla , Kaynarca
Kulaklı , Kaynarca
Müezzinler, Kaynarca
Okçular, Kaynarca
Ömerağa , Kaynarca
Ortaköy, Kaynarca
Osmanlı, Kaynarca
Sabırlı , Kaynarca
Sarıbeyli , Kaynarca
Şeyhtimarı, Kaynarca
Taşoluk, Kaynarca
Topçu, Kaynarca
Turnalı , Kaynarca
Uğurlu , Kaynarca
Uzakkışla , Kaynarca
Uzunalan , Kaynarca
Yeniçam , Kaynarca
Yeşilova , Kaynarca
Ziamet , Kaynarca

Kocaali
 Kocaali
Açmabaşı , Kocaali
Akpınar , Kocaali
Aktaş , Kocaali
Aydoğan , Kocaali
Beyler, Kocaali
Bezirgan, Kocaali
Caferiye , Kocaali
Çakmaklı , Kocaali
Çobansayvant , Kocaali
Çukurköy , Kocaali
Demiraçma , Kocaali
Görele, Kocaali
Gümüşoluk , Kocaali
Kadıköy , Kocaali
Karalar , Kocaali
Karapelit, Kocaali
Kestanepınarı , Kocaali
Kirazlı, Kocaali
Kızılüzüm, Kocaali
Koğukpelit , Kocaali
Köyyeri , Kocaali
Kozluk , Kocaali
Küplük , Kocaali
Lahna , Kocaali
Melen , Kocaali
Selahiye , Kocaali
Şerbetpınar, Kocaali
Süngüt , Kocaali
Yalpankaya , Kocaali
Yanıksayvant , Kocaali

Pamukova
Pamukova
Ağaççılar , Pamukova
Ahiler, Pamukova
Akçakaya , Pamukova
Bacıköy , Pamukova
Bakacak , Pamukova
Bayırakçaşehir, Pamukova
Çardak , Pamukova
Cihadiye , Pamukova
Çilekli , Pamukova
Eğriçay , Pamukova
Eskiyayla , Pamukova
Fevziye, Pamukova
Gökgöz , Pamukova
Hayrettin , Pamukova
Hüseyinli , Pamukova
İsabalı , Pamukova
Kadıköy , Pamukova
Karapınar , Pamukova
Kazımiye , Pamukova
Kemaliye , Pamukova
Mekece, Pamukova
Mesruriye , Pamukova
Oruçlu , Pamukova
Özbek, Pamukova
Paşalar , Pamukova
Pınarlı , Pamukova
Şahmelek , Pamukova
Şeyhvarmaz, Pamukova
Teşvikiye , Pamukova
Turgutlu , Pamukova

Sapanca
Sapanca
Akçay , Sapanca
Balkaya , Sapanca
Fevziye , Sapanca
Hacımercan , Sapanca
İkramiye , Sapanca
İlmiye , Sapanca
İstanbuldere , Sapanca
Kuruçeşme, Sapanca
Mahmudiye, Sapanca
Memnuniye, Sapanca
Muradiye , Sapanca
Nailiye, Sapanca
Şükriye, Sapanca
Ünlüce, Sapanca
Uzunkum, Sapanca
Yanık, Sapanca

Serdivan
Serdivan
Aşağıdereköy , Serdivan
Beşevler , Serdivan
Çubuklu , Serdivan
Dağyoncalı, Serdivan
Kızılcıklı , Serdivan
Kuruçeşme, Serdivan
Meşeli , Serdivan
Selahiye , Serdivan
Uzunköy , Serdivan
Yukarıdereköy , Serdivan

Söğütlü
Söğütlü
Beşdeğirmen , Söğütlü
Fındıklı , Söğütlü
Hasanfakı , Söğütlü
İmamlar, Söğütlü
Kantar , Söğütlü
Karateke , Söğütlü
Kurudil , Söğütlü
Levent , Söğütlü
Mağara , Söğütlü
Maksudiye , Söğütlü
Sıraköy , Söğütlü
Soğucak , Söğütlü
Tokmaklıdere, Söğütlü
Türkbeylikkışla , Söğütlü
Yeniköy , Söğütlü

Taraklı
Taraklı
Aksu, Taraklı
Alballar , Taraklı
Avdan , Taraklı
Çamtepe , Taraklı
Dışdedeler, Taraklı
Duman, Taraklı
Esenyurt , Taraklı
Hacıaliler , Taraklı
Hacıyakup, Taraklı
Harkköy , Taraklı
İçdedeler, Taraklı
Kemaller, Taraklı
Mahdumlar , Taraklı
Pirler , Taraklı
Tuzla, Taraklı
Uğurlu , Taraklı
Yeniköy, Taraklı

Recent development
According to Law act no 6360, all Turkish provinces with a population more than 750 000, were renamed as metropolitan municipality. All districts in those provinces became second level municipalities and all villages in those districts  were renamed as a neighborhoods . Thus the villages listed above are officially neighborhoods of Sakarya.

References

List
Sakarya
Marmara Region